Taos Air is a virtual airline that operates seasonal scheduled public air charter service between Taos Regional Airport in Taos, New Mexico and several airports in California and Texas. The airline is owned by Taos Ski Valley, Inc. Service to Texas began in the 2018–2019 winter season while the 2019–2020 winter season saw the introduction of California routes. The carrier operated Fairchild Dornier 328JETs from 2018 through summer 2022 then switched to Embraer 135 regional jets operated by JSX Air beginning with the 2022–2023 winter ski season.

History
On 20 December 2018, Taos Air began service with scheduled flights from Taos Regional Airport to Dallas and Austin, Texas, using a 30-seat Dornier 328JET. The service was introduced to promote skiing in the Taos area, and free shuttle service to Taos Ski Valley was offered. Taos Air is owned by Taos Ski Valley, Inc., which pays for operation and upkeep of the aircraft, with the Town of Taos providing terminal access, marketing, de-icing service, and a hangar. The aircraft was operated on a charter basis by Ultimate Jetcharters, an FAR Part 135 air charter company that also operates scheduled charter flights under the Ultimate Air Shuttle brand name.

During its inaugural season, the carrier used a private terminal at Dallas Love Field; no Transportation Security Administration security checks were required.

In March 2019, the Taos County Board of Commissioners and the Town of Taos voted to give Taos Air grants totaling $850,000 for summer service to promote tourism. On 9 April, Taos Air received final approval to operate summer flights. Despite this, the flights were canceled in June 2019 due to unavailability of aircraft and pilots from the charter company, and consequently the grant money was not disbursed.

Texas flights resumed on December 19, 2019, using a 328JET, operated by Advanced Air. In January 2020, service to Hawthorne Municipal Airport and McClellan-Palomar Airport in California was introduced as the airline acquired a second 328JET. Service for the 2019–2020 ski season was intended to continue until March 29, 2020 but was terminated on March 15, 2020 due to the COVID-19 pandemic. 

On November 6, 2020, citing "the uncertainty of current and future travel restrictions to New Mexico" due to the ongoing COVID-19 pandemic, Taos Ski Valley canceled Taos Air service for the 2020–2021 winter season. In early 2021, Taos Ski Valley announced that the resort would reopen on 26 November 2021 and Taos Air service would restart around that time. In May 2021, the airline announced summer service from July 1 to September 27 2021. Summer and winter service continued through 2022 under Advanced Air. For the summer of 2022, service to Austin, Texas was switched from the Austin-Bergstrom International Airport to the Austin Executive Airport.

Beginning with the 2022–2023 ski season, Taos Air switched operators from Advanced Air to JSX Air using 30-seat Embraer 135 regional jets rather than the former Dornier 328JETs. The new service began on December 15, 2022, again with flights to Dallas, Austin, the Los Angeles area, and San Diego. The flights to Dallas continue to operate through Love Field, the Austin flights are back to Bergstrom International Airport, the Los Angeles flights are now served through the Burbank Airport instead of Hawthorne, California, and the San Diego flights now operate through the San Diego International Airport rather than the former Carlsbad, California Airport.

Operators
Taos Air flights were operated by Ultimate Jetcharters for the 2018–2019 season. Advanced Air operated flights for the 2019–2020 season, 2021 summer, 2021–2022 winter, and 2022 summer seasons. Currently, JSX will operate flights beginning with the 2022–2023 winter season.

Fleet

The Taos Air fleet consists of the following aircraft:
2 Fairchild Dornier 328JET (until September 30, 2022)
2 Embraer 135 regional jets (since December 15, 2022)

Destinations
Taos Air serves the following destinations:
Austin, Texas - Austin–Bergstrom International Airport
Dallas, Texas - Dallas Love Field
Burbank, California -  Hollywood Burbank Airport
San Diego, California -  San Diego International Airport
Taos, New Mexico - Taos Regional Airport (hub)

See also
 Air transportation in the United States
 Transportation in the United States

References

External links

Airlines established in 2018
Airlines based in New Mexico
2018 establishments in New Mexico
Taos, New Mexico
Transportation in Taos County, New Mexico